400 West Market is a skyscraper in Downtown Louisville, Kentucky. It was Kentucky's tallest building when built for $100 million in 1991. Its groundbreaking ceremony occurred in July 1991 with initial occupancy in October 1992 and final occupancy in April 1993. Originally called Capital Holding Building and later, Capital Holding Center, the structure was later renamed Providian Center then AEGON Center as the business was renamed and sold. AEGON left the building in 2010, and the building was renamed 400 West Market in 2014.

Currently the tallest building in the state of Kentucky, the building is constructed of reinforced concrete, as opposed to the steel construction usual for buildings of its height. The upper floors of the building are also illuminated at night.  400 West Market's lighting is changed from the usual white to a combination of red and green from Thanksgiving Day until New Year's Day.

The skyscraper has 633,650 square feet (58,868 m²) of leaseable space for office and 18,787 square feet (1,745 m²) for retail.

The original owner of 400 West Market was a limited partnership which consisted of Hines Interest, as a general partner, and Japanese limited partners. In April, 2004, David Werner's investment group purchased the building.

There is a statue in the plaza of 400 West Market of Alysheba, winner of the 1987 Kentucky Derby and a 1993 U.S. Racing Hall of Fame inductee.

Gallery

See also
List of tallest buildings by U.S. state
Commonwealth Building
List of tallest buildings in Louisville

References

External links
Hines Property portal
Hines Interests L.P. -Property Search

Office buildings completed in 1993
John Burgee buildings
Skyscraper office buildings in Louisville, Kentucky
Philip Johnson buildings
1993 establishments in Kentucky